Laurence O'Fuarain (born 24 April 1990) is an Irish actor, having had roles in season 5 of Game of Thrones (2015), Rebellion (2016), season 5 of Vikings (2017) and Into the Badlands (2017). He appears as Fjall the warrior in the 2022 Netflix miniseries The Witcher: Blood Origin.

Early life and education
Laurence O'Fuarain studied advertising and marketing at the Institute of Technology, Tallaght when by chance, got involved in the making of some short films of which he enjoyed. After a successful audition to join the Bow Street Academy, he decided to leave the ITT to concentrate on acting. In 2014, O'Fuarain graduated from the Programme of Screen Acting at Bow Street Academy in Dublin and was in the same group of alumni as Niamh Algar. In his spare time, O'Fuarain is a keen angler.

Career
In 2015, straight after the academy, O'Fuarain made his film debut in the Irish film The Limit Of, although the film was not released until 2018. He followed that with small roles in The Secret Scripture (2016)  and in a single episode of season 5 of Game of Thrones. The same year he landed a recurring role as Desmond Byrne in Rebellion.
In 2017, O'Fuarain picked up small roles in season 5 of Vikings and also Into the Badlands.
In 2018, O'Fuarain secured the part of Vern in the film Viking Destiny opposite Terrance Stamp and Will Mellor,  as Kevin Gunn in Don't Go and in Black '47.

In August 2021, O'Fuarain began filming of the Netflix miniseries The Witcher: Blood Origin, set in a time 1,200 years before The Witcher, and O'Fuarain stars as Fjall, of a clan of warriors sworn to protect a King in a quest for redemption, in a cast which includes Lenny Henry, Mirren Mack and Michelle Yeoh. The Witcher: Blood Origin aired on Netflix on 25 December 2022.

Filmography

Film

Television

References

External links
 
Agent profile 1
Agent profile 2
Laurence O'Fuarain Tudum interview

21st-century Irish male actors
Alumni of the Bow Street Academy
Irish male film actors
Irish male television actors
Living people
1990 births